Joseph "Joe" Goldberg is a fictional character and protagonist of the You book series, written by Caroline Kepnes, as well as the television series of the same name, where he is portrayed by American actor Penn Badgley, by Gianni Ciardiello, Aidan Wallace and Jack Fisher as a youth, and as his inner self by Ed Speleers. Joe is a serial killer, stalker and former bookstore manager who, upon meeting Guinevere Beck at his workplace in New York, develops an extreme, toxic and delusional obsession with her. After moving to Los Angeles, to escape his sordid past, he meets avid chef Love Quinn, and starts to fall into his old habits of obsession and violence in order to avoid the fate of his past romantic endeavors. However, after his troubled marriage with Love falls apart, he abandons his life in the United States and soon moves to London, where he begins tracking down the Eat-the-Rich killer, while also managing his infatuation with Kate Lockwood.

Television series

Early life 
At the story's outset, it is revealed that Joe was orphaned at a young age. From flashbacks, it is revealed that Joe's biological mother, Sandy (Magda Apanowicz) was abused by his biological father and that he was subjected to neglect and abuse by his father. Seeking to protect his mother, Joe (Aidan Wallace) shoots and kills his biological father. Sometime after, she tells him she is currently not fit to care for him and a Child Protection Services worker takes him and sends him to New York State’s Irving Group Home For Boys.

After a few years in the foster care system, it's implied that Mr. Mooney (Mark Blum) adopted Joe (Gianni Ciardiello), took care of him and gave him a job at the bookstore. Though, it is later highlighted that Mooney subjected Joe to a similar abusive treatment, locking him in a plexiglass cage vault, below his bookstore, against his will. As part of his "lesson", Mooney would teach the value of reading and books to Joe, in order to show his affection and reverence towards such activities.

Season 1 

Joe, now the bookstore's manager, tries to win over MFA student Guinevere Beck (Elizabeth Lail) by manipulating everything and everyone around her. He justifies his actions by stating that in order to pursue Beck, he wants to make sure that she is worth it and won't break his heart. He continuously implies that a similar instance occurred in the past with his ex-girlfriend, Candace Stone (Ambyr Childers), who is presumed to be dead.

Joe is also good friends with his next-door neighbor, Paco (Luca Padovan), a boy who has an abusive home life and is always trying to escape by reading books. After Paco attempts to kill his mom’s boyfriend Ron (Daniel Cosgrove) by giving him an overdose of pills, Ron passes out outside Joe's apartment and savagely beats Joe upon waking. Paco's mother, Claudia (Victoria Cartagena) breaks up with Ron, with Joe's encouragement, but soon relapses back into drug addiction.

After a day of following Beck around in the shadows, Joe saves Beck after she falls on to a train track. At the same time, he steals her phone and after she replaces it, he is able to read her messages synced to the cloud. He believes her wealthy, spoiled boyfriend Benji Ashby (Lou Taylor Pucci) is an obstacle to his future relationship with Beck and tricks Benji into meeting him, hits him over the head, and keeps him captive in a climate-controlled cage for rare books in Mooney's basement. He eventually kills Benji using his peanut allergy to induce anaphylactic shock and burns his remains in the woods.

Joe and Beck start dating and he is introduced to her wealthy Ivy League friends. Her best friend, Peach Salinger (Shay Mitchell), is suspicious of his intentions and ridicules him for working in retail. Joe sees Peach as another obstacle in his relationship with Beck, so follows her in Central Park and hits her with a rock at the back of her head. He later kills her after she invites Beck to a retreat at the Salinger estate in Greenwich, framing her death as a suicide.

Beck returns to therapy to deal with her grief, and Joe becomes suspicious of her relationship with her therapist, Dr. Nicky (John Stamos). He attends therapy sessions with Dr. Nicky using a fake story. He initially plans to kill Dr. Nicky, but decides to give Beck space and begins dating Karen Minty (Natalie Paul), a friend of Claudia's.

Beck misses Joe and pursues him again. After he breaks up with Karen, they begin another relationship. However, she grows suspicious when he continually avoids the topic of his ex-girlfriend, Candace. Through flashbacks, it is revealed that Joe killed Elijah Thornton (Esteban Benito) after he discovered that Candace was sleeping with him in order to get a record deal at his company.

Later, Joe discovers that Beck slept with Dr. Nicky and confronts her. After Beck apologizes to him for her erroneous behavior, he states that they can work on these issues in their relationship as long as they trust each other. After the pair have sex, Joe subsequently leaves the apartment in the morning to get some breakfast for Beck. Moments later, Beck encounters Paco who asks for Joe. Paco inadvertently exposes the location of a secret place Joe uses to hide things. After Beck discovers a box in the ceiling of Joe's bathroom containing souvenirs and stolen items from her house, from Peach, and dental remains from Benji, she tries to escape, but Joe kidnaps her and traps her in the basement of his workplace.

Beck writes a novel implicating Dr. Nicky in her murder to convince Joe that she understands him. He later leaves her again at night and kills Ron. Later, Paco helps Joe cover up Ron's murder because of how grateful he is. Joe attempts to convince Beck that all his previous actions (however bad they may be) were done all for her safety and to make her life better. She is understandably conflicted but ultimately realises that Joe is insane and the man she thought she knew wasn't who he claimed he was. Beck acts as if she loves Joe to get him to unlock the glass cage he kept her in and manages to get herself free and locks him in, telling him he is a sick monster who preys on people and abuses his power on them. In his last conversation with Beck, Joe finally understands that Beck will never love him. Shortly after, he kills her by strangulation and sets up her murderer to be doctor Nicky. Months later, Beck's book is published and Dr. Nicky is incarcerated. Candace shows up at the bookstore, leaving Joe stunned.

Season 2 

After Candace's return, she explains how she survived the night that Joe thought he killed her. She taunts Joe with her knowledge of his guilt in Beck's death and threatens him. After escaping from her grasp, Joe quickly heads to Los Angeles. At Los Angeles International Airport, he notices a public frenzy surrounding a famous stand-up comedian, Henderson (Chris D'Elia). Joe later encounters Will Bettelheim (Robin Lord Taylor), a hacker from a Craigslist meeting. When Will cannot create an untraceable identity for him, Joe kidnaps Will and imprisons him in a plexiglass vault hidden in a storage facility. Using Will's name, Joe secures an apartment and befriends the building manager and neighbor, Delilah Alves (Carmela Zumbado) and her teenage sister, Ellie Alves (Jenna Ortega).

Joe meets Calvin (Adwin Brown), the manager of a trendy family-owned, health-conscious grocery store, Anavrin, and is hired as a clerk in the book cafe of the store. Joe then meets Love Quinn (Victoria Pedretti), a widow who works in the kitchen and her addict-riddled brother, Forty Quinn (James Scully). Love makes advances on Joe, but he initially resists. They meet again and Love believes that their encounters are attributable to fate. Later, it is revealed that Joe manipulated circumstances to get his job and apartment and secretly orchestrated his encounter with Love.

Joe corresponds with a man named Jasper Krenn (Steven W. Bailey), who is after the real Will Bettelheim for money. Joe promises to deliver, but Jasper pins him down and severs the tip of one of his fingers. Jasper explains that if Joe can stop the bleeding, he'll have about 12 hours to get his fingertip reattached and that he will keep the fingertip in a cooler as ransom. Will instructs Joe to go to a house party at San Fernando Valley in order to retrieve cash from a man named Rufus. Before heading to the party, Joe cancels his invite to Love's lunch gathering with her friends. Later, Joe finds Rufus, but he offers him a bag of pills instead of cash. Joe later lures Jasper to his storage facility and kills him. He has his fingertip reattached and then dismembers and disposes of Jasper's body.

Love confronts Joe, revealing that she has uncovered his lies through talking with her brother Forty. He later apologizes and they decided to just be friends for the moment. Joe tries to resist his growing attraction to Love and befriends Forty as a distraction. When Forty has a meltdown at a party, Joe calls Love to assist and they later begin a sexual relationship. But Joe's relationship with Love is challenged by Forty's emotional dependency.

Delilah tells Joe she was drugged and raped as a teenager by Henderson. Joe later catches Ellie hanging out with Henderson and promises to protect her from the predator, having already secretly installed a control chip in her cell phone. He infiltrates a party at Henderson's house and steals his laptop. After giving Will the pills, Joe has him go through the laptop but finds nothing. He later learns from Forty that there is a secret room in Henderson's place. Will gives him information that allows him to enter the room, and Joe finds photos of unconscious women, including Delilah. Joe discovers Ellie has disabled the chip on her phone and is heading to Henderson's house. Joe spikes his drink with GHB, then tortures him. Henderson attempts to escape, and Joe knocks him down the stairs, killing him. Joe is later confronted by Delilah’s cop friend, David Fincher (Danny Vasquez) who catches him for jaywalking, but lets him go with a warning. Back at the vault, Joe frees Will after he promises to disappear and not report him.

Forty tells Love he has met a woman named Amy Adam, who turns out to be Candace, who has tracked Joe down seeking revenge. Love, Joe, Forty and Candace attend a wellness retreat with Love and Forty's family. After Forty has another breakdown and Love confronts her mother, she confides in Joe about Forty's childhood sexual assault. Joe opens up about his father's physical abuse and Joe and Love feel closer than ever. However, Candace warns Joe that the truth will come out and it is revealed that she has convinced Forty to write a script based on Beck's novel.

Love becomes suspicious of Candace's behavior and hires a private investigator to follow her. Joe goes to Candace's apartment to kill her, but she goes to his apartment, where she exposes the truth about his past to Love. When he returns, Love confronts him but he convinces her that he left New York to escape Candace's lies, but they later break up.

Joe and Delilah have a short-lived fling and Love begins an affair with Milo Warrington (Andrew Creer), her late husband's best friend. Joe and Delilah are arrested for lewd conduct in public, but Joe manages to get Forty to use his connections to get them out of jail. When Fincher reveals his suspicions about Joe to Delilah, she takes his keys and goes to his storage facility. He finds her there and locks her in the vault. Before he can return, Forty sets up an elaborate self-abduction scheme by locking himself, Joe and Ellie in a hotel room to fix his script. He eventually drugs Joe with LSD. Joe and Love reconcile, and Love convinces him to stay in Los Angeles. Forty eventually finishes the script, correctly inferring that Beck's ex killed her in a crime of passion. Forty confesses to Joe that as a young man he killed the au pair who assaulted him as a child.

By the time Joe returns to the storage unit, he finds Delilah dead. He later gets a call from Will, who did not report him but took a trip to Manila. Candace discovers the location of the vault and arrives to find Joe with Delilah's corpse. She locks him in the vault and calls Love to prove that Joe is a dangerous killer. Joe decides to confess the whole truth to Love, who reacts unexpectedly, luring Candace away from the vault and killing her to prevent her from calling the police.

Love reveals to Joe, that she created the conditions to make him fall in love with her. She mentions that she was the one who killed Forty's child rapist and framed him for the murder. She also reveals that she killed Delilah to prevent Joe from being forced to flee to Mexico. Love explains that she intends to frame Ellie for Henderson's murder, fake Delilah's death as a suicide, and build a new family with Joe and Forty. Alarmed at Love's machinations, Joe tries to kill her, but stops when she divulges that she's pregnant with his unborn child.

Forty continues to uncover the real mystery of Beck's murder and interviews Dr. Nicky at a correctional facility in New York. He uncovers the truth and heads back to try to get Love away from Joe, saying he is a serial killer. Forty claims that his sister has always been crazy, and is then killed by Fincher just before he manages to kill Joe. Love uses the power of her family to clean up Joe's criminal record and frames her deceased brother for the murder of Henderson. By the end of the season, Joe has returned to his obsessive nature, and, after moving in with Love in a suburban house, begins plotting a way to get to a new neighbor.

Season 3 

After moving to Madre Linda, Love gives birth to a boy they name Henry but Joe feels unpleasant because he was told it would be a baby girl. With Joe back into his usual obsessive nature, he starts plotting his move with his new neighbor Natalie Engler, a married woman who lives separately.
However, Joe refuses to cheat on Love when Natalie tries to seduce him. Ironically, Love figures Joe's obsession after attending a dinner party that Natalie was also at. Love tricks Natalie into meeting her where she kills Natalie and calls Joe to help her cover it up. The two then do everything in their power to cover up the impulsive murder performed by Love while staying low as to not draw any unwanted attention their family.
Everything seems to be back to normal, but Natalie’s widowed husband doesn’t believe the story of her running away and starts investigating friends and neighbours.

Henry is infected with measles and barely recovers. When one of their neighbours, Gil Brigham, admits that he is an anti-vaxxer and his unvaccinated daughters infected Henry, Love assaults him and she and Joe are forced to imprison him. They eventually uncover evidence that Gil's son sexually assaulted his schoolmate and attempt to use it as leverage so they can let Gil go without having to worry about him reporting them to the police. Unfortunately, Gil commits suicide out of guilt. Joe and Love frame him for Natalie's murder, writing that he was having an affair with her.

Love, feeling unappreciated by Joe begins an affair with Natalie’s stepson Theo — but subsequently ends it when she realizes that she wants to make it work with Joe.

Joe, on the other hand, becomes infatuated with bookstore manager Marienne Bellamy, who is in a custody battle over her daughter Juliette with her abusive ex-husband Ryan Goodwin. Joe attempts to sabotage Ryan, but resorts to ambushing and murdering him. Love discovers his affair, paralyses Joe with aconite and prepares to murder Marienne, but changes her mind when she sees Juliette, reveals Joe's crimes and convinces Marienne and Juliette to go on the run. Joe recovers and murders Love, gives away Henry to a couple he knows,  subsequently faking his death and escaping to France.

Season 4

Part 1 
Joe manages to track down Marienne at a London art festival, but she rejects him. A disillusioned assassin hired by the Quinn family confronts him, but spares him and provides him a false identity in exchange for money. Joe uses his false credentials to become a university English professor. He becomes interested in Kate Galvin, an art gallerist and the girlfriend of his colleague and neighbour Malcolm Harding. After Joe saves Kate from two muggers, Malcolm then invites Joe to a party as a thank you, where he meets aspiring politician Rhys Montrose, artist Simon Soo and aristocrats Roald Walker-Burton, Gemma Graham-Greene and Lady Phoebe Borehall-Blaxworth. After a long night of partying, Joe passes out. The next morning, Joe wakes up at home with Malcolm stabbed to death on his dining table. 

After Joe disposes of Malcolm's body, he is sent anonymous texts by Malcolm's real killer thanking Joe for disposing of the evidence. Joe suspects that one of Kate and Malcolm's friends and infiltrates their social circle in order to investigate them. During the course of the investigation, Simon is murdered while at an art exhibition, Joe's stalker deduces his true identity and Joe forms a sexual relationship with Kate. Joe murders Phoebe's bodyguard Vic.

Phoebe invites Joe along to her Hampshire country house, where he begins to suspect Roald of being the killer and has an altercation with him. After hearing a scream, Joe discovers Kate kneeling over Gemma's corpse with a knife. She pleads her innocence and forces Joe to help her hide the body. Joe is caught by Roald, who attempts to kill him with a rifle, but is quickly incapitated. Rhys arrives and reveals that he was Joe's stalker and the killer.

Chaining Joe and Roald in the catacombs of the country house, Rhys reveals that his plans to murder the rest of the friend group and orders Joe to kill Roald so they can frame him as the killer. When Joe refuses, Rhys sets the catacombs on fire, but Joe and Roald manage to escape. Kate offers to take Joe out on a date, but Joe rejects her, planning to take down Rhys, who announces his mayoral campaign.

Part 2 
Back in London, Rhys blackmails Joe into framing someone as the Eat the Rich killer. Joe chooses to frame Dawn Brown, a woman who attempted to kidnap Phoebe. Rhys continues to blackmail Joe and orders him to kill Kate's father, billionaire Tom Lockwood. Officially entering a relationship with Kate, Joe goes to meet Tom, who recognises him his true identity as Love Quinn's husband and contracts him to assassinate Rhys. Joe learns that Rhys kidnapped and imprisoned Marienne.

Joe tracks down Rhys at his ex-wife's house, unsuccessfully tortures him for Marienne's location and chokes him to death in a rage. When Joe continues to see Rhys, he then realises that he had developed a split personality that took the physical form of Rhys; the real Rhys had never met him. Joe himself had kidnapped and imprisoned Marienne and committed the Eat-the-Rich murders.

Joe finds Marienne and resolves to free her after making arrangements to escape. He finds her phone and seemingly realises that she had lost custody of her daughter, which devastates her when he relays the news to her. He later finds her seemingly dead from overdosing on oxycodone pills he previously planted on her. Believing Marienne to have died, Joe disposes of her body at a park to make her look like she overdosed. Nadia, however, plotted with Marienne to fake the latter's death so that she could escape.

Luring him with a text from Kate's phone, Joe murders Tom and his bodyguard before preparing to commit suicide out of guilt over Marienne's death and to prevent himself from hurting anyone else. Joe throws himself off a bridge, but his "dark" side survives. Discovering that his student Nadia had been spying on him, Joe murders her boyfriend and frames it on her. Kate uses her resources to wipe Joe's past clean and they return to New York.

Development 
In 2014, Caroline Kepnes released her first novel of the thriller series, You. Kepnes explained that she wrote the novel during a dark period of her life, the year her father died of cancer, and in which she experienced several other personal challenges. Later, Kepnes was initially hesitant on labeling Joe, as a few readers argued that his actions classified him as a serial killer. The author then clarified her position on the matter, citing that "I remember when I wrote You and someone first referred to Joe as a serial killer. I argued 'he’s not a serial killer, he meets these terrible people and has these awful thoughts, but he’s very sensitive'. It’s very strange to realize you have written a serial killer."

Sera Gamble, the showrunner and co-creator of the television adaptation mentioned in an interview with Collider, that when envisioning Joe, the main protagonist of the series, she wanted to delve deeply into the root cause of the pathology that shaped his amoral position to justify and rationalize stalking, kidnapping and killing his victims. When she was writing the character, she stated that "I want to understand what coaxes behavior of this nature out of that very tiny percentage of men. I like to think it's a very tiny percentage of men who would cross a line like the line that Joe Goldberg crosses". In an interview at The Contenders Emmys 2019 panel, Gamble highlighted the importance of casting the right person to play the role of Joe Goldberg. She stated that "it had to be a love story and a horror movie in every single scene", further adding that if they "cast someone who was sort of creepy, then the story wouldn’t work; the idea is that it’s a lead in a romantic comedy who works in a bookstore and a woman walks in, they have a cute meet and fall in love and live happily ever after. That’s the show."

Expanding on her commentary on the show's themes and origin, Gamble stated at The Hollywood Reporter'''s roundtable interview, that she was not surprised to hear an overwhelming reception to Joe's character amongst online fans and viewers, citing that "There's a very vocal contingent of fans of Caroline Kepnes' book [on which You is based] who were like, "I heart Joe." Essentially what she's done is taken the classic romantic hero and just peeled back the gloss and sheen and John Cusack with the boombox and she followed it to its logical conclusion. I mean, if you turn off the sappy music and turn on a David Fincher score, romantic comedies are stalker movies. The plot of pretty much every one I can think of — and we have watched all of them many times in the writers room — is contingent on the guy ... well, first of all, he has to do a certain amount of fucking up so she can forgive him. And he has to get over some of her shortcomings. I mean, that's love, right? But also, he's chasing her through a fucking airport, chasing her on a freeway, watching her sleep because he feels protective. Romantic comedy behavior in real life is criminal! And that was basically the starting place for the show."

 Portrayal 
Penn Badgley was cast in the lead character of Joe Goldberg in June 2017. Prior to the show's premiere, Badgley mentioned his disinterest in playing the character of Joe Goldberg in an interview with Entertainment Weekly, saying that "I didn’t want to do it — it was too much. I was conflicted with the nature of the role. If this is a love story, what is it saying? It’s not an average show; it’s a social experiment." However, he was strongly convinced by the script and the social commentary around the series, adding that "what was key in me wanting to jump on board were my conversations with Greg Berlanti and Sera Gamble, the creators, and understanding Joe’s humanity. I knew that I would be conflicted about the role from day one till the last day, and that is why they thought I would be good for it, is that I’m not psyched to play somebody of this nature." Relaying similar thoughts in an interview with GQ, Badgley again raised his concerns of portraying Joe, noting that he was first apprehensive at the role but later changed his mind, expressing that "no one in any position of authority could ever try to act as though we don’t know that sex and murder sells, but how can it work in a different way we’ve not seen? That’s where I think this show does something that none of us could have said for certain that we would nail. It could have been really irresponsible. It could have fallen flat and been like, whoa." In another interview at The Contenders Emmys 2019 panel, Badgley mentioned that his character was "the hero of his own story...every serial killer is" but added that Joe is "ultimately, the word that’s coming to mind is un-saveable". The actor highlighted that, though there is an apparent affinity to Joe's character, it is somewhat of a "Rorschach test of a kind for us," adding that "we’re failing..."

 Reception 

 Critical response 
Penn Badgley's portrayal of Joe Goldberg has received critical acclaim. Many reviewers gave praise to Penn Badgley's performance and compared the eerie tone and terrifying approach established in the series to the themes of violence and stalking, reminiscent in contemporary thriller films and series like Dexter, Gone Girl and American Psycho. Certain reviewers have also highlighted that the series provides an alluring but disturbing insight into the mind and profile of a psychopath, who charmingly manipulates his way through his anti-hero charisma, motives and warped sense of morality, in order to convince the audience "to sympathize with a stalker" and "serial killer".

Alicia Lutes of IGN gave praise to Badgley's performance in her review of the series, highlighting that he is "doing some of his best, most unhinged work in the series. His charming nature and playful face are the perfect, twisted mask for the “Nice Guy With Control Issues” lurking underneath" and further adding that "Joe’s inner monologue frames the series in a way that shows just how malcontented a guy he really is despite his warm smile and cool demeanor."

Tiffany Kelly from Daily Dot praised the performance of Badgley in her review of the series by stating that he "shines as a bookstore manager and bone-chilling stalker in this surprisingly good thriller." While reviewing the first season, Anna Leszkiewicz from New Statesman praised Penn Badgley's performance, by declaring that the "Netflix series You does what it says on the tin – offering surprise twists, drip-fed reveals, a magnetic villain in Joe, the horrible suspense of knowing more than his clueless victims and satisfyingly gory murders." Christina Radish of Collider named Joe Goldberg as the "Best TV Villain" of 2018. Radish wrote that, "thanks to the performance given by Penn Badgley and some terrific writing, the character has layers that make him complicated and intriguing, even though you know he should be making you cringe and recoil. Joe Goldberg is a character that does horrible things, but also keeps you so engrossed that you can't stop watching." Tilly Pearce from Metro gave high praise to the actor's performance in the second season, noting that "Penn Badgley is perfect in this role, as is Victoria Pedretti, and we can’t wait to see what season three (assuming it happens) brings."

Samantha Highfill from Entertainment Weekly mentioned You in her wish list of contenders for the 2019 Emmy Nominations. Praising Badgley's performance, she notes that the series "presented a different look at a serial killer, one that took viewers inside the mind of Joe Goldberg, thereby presenting them with the reasoning for his actions. By never shying away from Joe’s dark side, the show’s freshman season unraveled a beautifully paced modern-day thriller about what people do for love...and what is acceptable to do for love."

Team TVLine ranked the performances of Penn Badgley and Victoria Pedretti at the top of The TVLine Performers of the Week list. Praising the two, the team notes that "embodying a sympathetic serial killer is no easy feat, yet Penn Badgley has spent the past two seasons of You'' making the process appear effortless. And just as his character, Joe Goldberg, finally met his match this season in the form of a woman named Love, so too has Badgley found the perfect on-screen companion in Love’s portrayer, Victoria Pedretti."

References 

American male characters in television
Characters in American novels of the 21st century
Fictional adoptees
Fictional characters from New York City
Fictional kidnappers
Fictional serial killers
Fictional stalkers
Fictional torturers
Literary characters introduced in 2014
Male characters in literature
Orphan characters in literature
Television characters introduced in 2018
Fictional victims of domestic abuse
Fictional librarians
Fictional characters with dissociative identity disorder